Martin Špegelj (11 November 1927 – 11 May 2014) was a Croatian army general and politician who served as the second defense minister of Croatia and, later, the chief of staff of the newborn Croatian army and inspector-general of the army. His efforts to organize and equip the army from scratch were seen as instrumental in helping Croatia survive the first year of the Croatian War of Independence. Partly owing to disagreements with president Franjo Tuđman, he retired in 1992, after the war froze with the permanent ceasefire at the end of 1991.

Early life 
Martin Spegelj was born 11 November 1927 in Stari Gradac, Pitomača. He was a partisan soldier during World War II. Eventually, he rose to become General of the 5th Yugoslav Army (JNA) Army District based in Zagreb, Croatia.

After the first free elections in Croatia, he was second Defence Minister. Špegelj was one of the few in the top leadership of Croatia who saw the impending war as unavoidable. Together with the Slovenian command, Špegelj formulated a joint defence plan in case either country was attacked by the JNA. At the same time he was smuggling weapons into Yugoslavia, arming paramilitary troops and organizing them for attacks on legitimate JNA forces.

Špegelj Tapes 
At the onset of the war in Croatia in mid 1990, the Croatian Serbs orchestrated an armed rebellion (known as the Log Revolution), refusing to accept Croatian government authority. As they were supported by the JNA (first covertly, then openly), Croatian forces were poorly armed, so Špegelj undertook a campaign of acquiring arms through the black market community, importing weapons from former Warsaw Pact countries like Hungary and Romania.

He was caught on tape in October 1990 talking to an assistant who was actually an undercover KOS operative. At the time, war in Croatia had not started yet.
In the conversations, Špegelj talks of arming Croatians in preparation for secession of Croatia and the impending civil war.
The so-called Špegelj tapes were turned into a documentary film by Zastava military film center and aired in January 1991 to the larger Yugoslav public. They were made public in order to bolster the attack of the Belgrade government against the newly elected Croatian government.

The Croatian leadership, including the main "actors" themselves, initially quickly dismissed the tapes as fake, claiming that the presumably innocuous videotaped conversations were subsequently dubbed. Their authenticity, however, was later confirmed by Stipe Mesić, the president of Croatia, who was one of the first on the Croatian side to admit that the tapes were authentic, although he claimed some of the sentences were taken out of context.

The JNA leadership in Belgrade wanted Špegelj to face trial for treason for this. As a result of the affair, and to calm tensions, Tuđman dismissed him from his post. Fearing for his life, Špegelj fled to Austria, where he remained for several months.

Return to Croatia 
Considering the rising tensions and the fall of first deaths of the impending war, Špegelj was persuaded to return to Croatia to become the chief of staff of the new army that was in the process of forming.

When the Slovenian War occurred in June 1991, Špegelj advocated activating the joint defence plan, which would put Croatia into war against the JNA by attacking its army barracks in Croatia (Špegelj's plan). However, Tuđman feared confrontation and refused to support the Slovenes.

Špegelj was then made inspector-general of the Croatian army, replaced partly owing to his disagreements with Tuđman.

Only several months later, full-scale war broke out, and Špegelj's plan for attacking JNA's army barracks in Croatia was implemented and resulted in the Battle of the Barracks, bringing much-needed heavy weapons to Croatia.

The war in Croatia entered a phase of lower intensity after the signing of a UN-brokered ceasefire at the start of 1992. Špegelj then officially retired.

Post-war and criticism 
Following the war, Špegelj became a fierce critic of Tuđman's politics, accusing him and his followers of war profiteering. In 2001, he published his autobiography, in which he was very critical of the Tuđman's HDZ and its political maneuverings, which he argued needlessly escalated the war. He also accused them of supporting Bosnian Croat separatism, which led to their conflict with the Bosniaks during the Bosnian War.

Špegelj was in turn criticized by pro-Tuđman elements of the Croatian military, notably Davor Domazet-Lošo, who considers that the June 1991 Slovenian War was just an excuse to draw Croatia into the conflict.

References 

Špegelj, Martin: Sjećanje Vojnika (Memories of a Soldier), 2001

1927 births
2014 deaths
People from Pitomača
Yugoslav Partisans members
Military personnel of the Croatian War of Independence
Croatian army officers
Defence ministers of Croatia
Generals of the Yugoslav People's Army
Croatian independence activists